Streptomyces tailanensis is a bacterium species from the genus of Streptomyces which has been isolated from silt from the Tailan River in China.

See also 
 List of Streptomyces species

References 

tailanensis
Bacteria described in 2020